The Kenai Peninsula Borough School District (KPBSD) serves 29 communities and 9,000 students in the Kenai Peninsula Borough. Headquartered in the Borough seat of Soldotna, The current Superintendent of Schools is Clayton Holland.

Schools

Charter schools

Statistics

Students

Personnel

Statistics 
 KPBSD serves 44 sites in 21 diverse communities.
 The district's total student population is 11% Alaska Native.

References

External links

 Kenai Peninsula Borough School District

School districts in Alaska
Education in Kenai Peninsula Borough, Alaska